Epigomphus corniculatus is a species of dragonfly in the family Gomphidae. It is endemic to Costa Rica.  Its natural habitats are subtropical or tropical moist lowland forests and rivers. It is threatened by habitat loss.

References

Sources

Gomphidae
Insects of Central America
Endemic fauna of Costa Rica
Taxonomy articles created by Polbot
Insects described in 1989